Peširovo is a village in the municipality of Sveti Nikole, North Macedonia.

Demographics
On the 1927 ethnic map of Leonhard Schulze-Jena, the village is written as "Bešerli" and shown as a Turkish village. As of the 2021 census, Peširovo had 256 residents with the following ethnic composition:
Macedonians 198
Persons for whom data are taken from administrative sources 55
Others 3

According to the 2002 census, the village had a total of 247 inhabitants. Ethnic groups in the village include:
Macedonians 247

References

Villages in Sveti Nikole Municipality